Diego José Hilaris (17?? - 18??) was a Dominican painter during the colonial period and one of the few native colonial artists whose works and legacy survive today. Believed to be born in Higüey, his series of pictorial paintings cover miracles of the Virgin Mary, or Virgen de la Altagracia, throughout the colony.

They constitute the only collection of colonial paintings preserved of which there is no doubt it was made in the country by a native artist. His art is imbued with primitivism as he was not formally trained, and they are considered significant in their historical, religious, anthropological, and artistic value of depicting costumbrist scenes during the country’s colonial era.

Biography 
Despite no specificities concerning his biography survive, it is known he was a criollo born on the island, most likely in Higüey during the mid 1700s with an estimated year of death believed to be in the early 1800s. Hilaris, completely self-taught, painted his series, known as medallions for their oval shape, approximately between the years 1760 and 1778; of the 27 whose existence is known, only 10 have been lost. Each medallion measure more than one meter high and 66 centimeters wide and are preserved in the Altagracia Museum located in Higüey.

According to the story, Hilaris was commissioned by the church to paint a series for the island’s Altragraciano miracles, and after initially declining, he became ill; only after praying to the Virgin Mary did he regain his health and eventually agree to paint the works. The medallion Autoretrato con santuario y montañas de Higüey is a self portrait depicting this event. The artist looks towards the church of Saint Dionisio in Higüey, one of the oldest churches in the Americas, while in the back mountains, several shacks and palms are shown, while a man riding a donkey climbs a trail. The cult of the Virgin of Altagracia is very old and has its origins in the earliest years of the colony, for she is considered the protective mother of Dominicans of Catholic faith to this day.

The medallion Los señores del cabildo de Santo Domingo is considered the richest and most complex of the series, for its composition, number of characters and for featuring a landscape layout. It depicts one of the oldest prodigious incidents, chronicled by the cleric Alcocer in 1650: the scene take places in Santo Domingo along the Ozama river bank, with the wall gates of San Diego and the Columbus Alcazar in the background. It precisely tries to show the moment when the citizens of the city realized that the significant painting of the Virgin Mary was nowhere to be found and the box that should have contained her image empty.

Gallery

References

People from La Altagracia Province
Dominican Republic male artists
18th-century Dominican Republic artists
Catholic painters